Haru Koshihara (24 January 1885 – 29 January 1959) was a Japanese educator and politician. The founder of Nagoya Women's University, she was one of the first group of women elected to the House of Representatives in 1946,

Biography
Koshihara was born in the village of Oppara in Kamo District of Gifu Prefecture (now part of Higashishirakawa). She graduated from high school in 1899 and joined a sewing course at Gifu Prefecture Normal School Training Centre. Aged 15, she began working at Kashimo No. 3 Elementary School in Ena District. A year later she returned to her parents to help run the family business for the next four years, before returning to teaching. She joined the preparatory school of Waseda University in 1909 and graduated from its department of Japanese, Chinese and History in 1913. In 1915 she established Nagoya Girls' School with her husband and took over as the school's principal in 1926.

Following World War II, Koshihara contested the 1946 general elections (the first in which women could vote) as a New Civic Party candidate, and was elected to the House of Representatives. After being elected, she joined the National Cooperative Party. She did not run for re-election in the 1947 elections, and in 1948 became principal of Nagoya Jogakuin Junior High School. She died the following year, and was posthumously awarded the Order of the Sacred Treasure.

References

1885 births
Japanese schoolteachers
Waseda University alumni
20th-century Japanese women politicians
20th-century Japanese politicians
Members of the House of Representatives (Japan)
National Cooperative Party politicians
Recipients of the Medal of Honor (Japan)
Recipients of the Order of the Sacred Treasure
1959 deaths
University and college founders
Women founders